The Swedish Alliance Mission, SAM, is a Christian denomination in Sweden, mainly based in the town of Jönköping. In 2009 the denomination had 13,448 members spread among 167 Swedish congregations and congregations outside Sweden.

The denomination was established in 1919 as a merger of Jönköping Mission Society, the Jönköping Circle Christian Youth Association and the Scandinavian Alliance Mission in Sweden.

References

External links

Svenska Alliansmissionen
Jönköpings allianskyrka